Hypocosmia floralis is a species of snout moth in the genus Hypocosmia. It was described by Stoll in 1782, and is known from Suriname.

References

Moths described in 1782
Chrysauginae